Rodney E. Anfenson (June 29, 1929 – April 13, 2001) was an American football, basketball, and track coach. He served as the head football coach at St. Cloud State University from 1965 to 1971, compiling a record of  27–32–4.

Head coaching record

College football

References

External links
 Bemidji State Hall of Fame profile
 St. Cloud State Hall of Fame profile
 

1929 births
2001 deaths
Bemidji State Beavers football players
Bemidji State Beavers men's basketball players
St. Cloud State Huskies athletic directors
St. Cloud State Huskies football coaches
St. Cloud State Huskies men's basketball coaches
College track and field coaches in the United States
High school football coaches in Minnesota
People from Faribault, Minnesota
Players of American football from Minnesota
Basketball players from Minnesota
American men's basketball players
Basketball coaches from Minnesota